Club Deportivo Chozas de Canales was a football team based in Chozas de Canales, Castile-La Mancha, Spain. Founded in 2005, its last season was 2010–11 in Tercera División – Group 18. The club's home ground was Viso Arena in Choza de Canales.

Before 2011–12 season, Chozas de Canales was expelled of Primera Autonómica Preferente due to numerous irregularities.

Season to season

1 season in Tercera División

References

External links
2010–11 Tercera División

Association football clubs established in 2007
Association football clubs disestablished in 2011
Defunct football clubs in Castilla–La Mancha
2007 establishments in Spain
2011 disestablishments in Spain
Province of Toledo